The Girl with the Dragon Tattoo is a 2009 crime thriller film directed by Niels Arden Oplev from a screenplay by Rasmus Heisterberg and Nikolaj Arcel and produced by Søren Stærmose, based on the 2005 novel of the same name by Swedish writer Stieg Larsson, the first entry in his Millennium series. The film stars Michael Nyqvist and Noomi Rapace.

That same year, two sequels, The Girl Who Played with Fire and The Girl Who Kicked the Hornets' Nest, were released in September and November, respectively.

Plot

In December 2002, journalist Mikael Blomkvist, publisher of independent magazine Millennium, loses a libel case involving unproven allegations that he published about billionaire financier Hans-Erik Wennerström, and is sentenced to three months in prison. Lisbeth Salander, a freelance surveillance agent and hacker, is hired by Henrik Vanger, the patriarch of the wealthy Vanger family, to conduct a background check on Blomkvist.

Vanger subsequently hires Blomkvist to investigate the disappearance of his niece, Harriet, who vanished on Children's Day decades earlier in 1966. Vanger believes that Harriet was murdered by a family member. Henrik explains that his brothers—Richard, Gottfried and Harald—are supporters of the Nazi regime. As Richard died in 1940, he is not a suspect. Her father, Gottfried, who is described as a heavy drinker, womanizer and wife beater, accidentally drowned in a lake a year prior to Harriet’s disappearance, so he is not a suspect either. After his death, since Harriet’s mother seemed incapable of/uninterested in taking care of her children (Harriet and her older brother Martin), Henrik took responsibility for raising the two.

Harald is a recluse who still clings to his strong Nazi views and is a suspect for the murder, as is Harriet's mother and all the other family members who were present on that day. Henrik also shows Blomkvist a room whose walls are covered with pressed flowers. The first ones were gifts from Harriet, and since her disappearance, a flower has arrived each year from different places around the world. Henrik believes that Harriet's killer is sending them to taunt him.

Salander, who was ruled mentally incompetent as a child, is placed in the custody of a new legal guardian, Nils Bjurman, after her previous guardian suffers a stroke. Bjurman makes it clear to Lisbeth that unless she does what he tells her, he will make her life very difficult and even threatens her with incarceration in a mental hospital. Bjurman also takes over control of Lisbeth's bank account and refuses to let her access her own money. Lisbeth lies to Bjurman about the nature of her work by pretending that she is just an office assistant.

Lisbeth is attacked by a group of drunk thugs in the subway. Although she manages to fight them off, her laptop is broken. She visits a hacker friend of hers, "Plague", who can save the hard drive and let her use his spare PC, but only until she can get a replacement laptop. She goes to see Bjurman, who forces her to perform fellatio on him in return for the money that she needs to buy a new computer; he refuses to give her the full amount she needs. Lisbeth calls him again the next day, but when she goes to meet with Bjurman, he handcuffs her to his bed then beats and rapes her. Lisbeth secretly records the encounter with a hidden device. She later returns to Bjurman, uses a taser to incapacitate him, ties him up, rapes him with a dildo, shows him the hidden camera footage, explains what she really does for a living, and tells him that she is taking back control of her money and her life. If anything happens to her, then the video recording will be released, and any threat to her will result in the same outcome. She then uses a tattoo machine to brand Bjurman's abdomen with the message "I am a sadistic pig and a rapist".

Blomkvist moves to a cottage on the Vanger estate and meets the Vanger family, including Harriet's brother Martin, who is the head of the Vanger group, and her cousin Cecilia. Martin is congenial and invites Blomkvist over for dinner; he and Cecilia both think that Harriet simply ran away, as she was unhappy at home. Inside Harriet's diary, Blomkvist finds a list of five names alongside what appears to be phone numbers. He visits retiring police inspector Morell, who informs him that his team had been unable to decipher them when they worked on Harriet's case. After viewing photographs taken during the Children's Day parade, Blomkvist sees Harriet's facial expression change suddenly just before she leaves and, after obtaining photographs taken from the same side of the street that she was on, comes to believe that Harriet may have seen her murderer that day.

Using her access to Blomkvist's computer, Salander theorizes that the numbers in Harriet's diary are references to verses in the Book of Leviticus and emails Blomkvist anonymously. Blomkvist figures out that Salander sent the email and hires her as a research assistant. Together, Blomkvist and Salander connect all but one of the names on Harriet's list to murdered women. They are all Jewish names, which intrigues Blomkvist, as the Vanger family has a long history of antisemitism. During the investigation, Blomkvist and Salander become lovers.

They suspect Henrik's reclusive brother Harald to be the murderer, as he is the only other surviving Vanger brother. Salander searches through Vanger's business records to trace Harald to the crime scenes, while Blomkvist breaks into Harald's house, believing it to be unoccupied. He discovers many Nazi texts and memorabilia amid the wreckage of the interior of the house, which has been left to decay. When Harald attacks Blomkvist, Martin appears and saves him. Harald insults Martin for stopping him from shooting Blomkvist. Martin escorts Blomkvist to his home, where Blomkvist reveals what he and Salander have uncovered. Martin says that he'll call the police, but instead he drugs Blomkvist. Salander's search of the company accounts points to Martin and his late father, Gottfried, as having been jointly responsible for the murders. She returns to the cottage to find Blomkvist missing.

Blomkvist wakes to find himself bound in Martin's cellar. Martin explains that Gottfried began teaching him to rape, torture, and kill as a teenager. Martin boasts about raping and murdering women for decades since his father's death. However, he denies killing Harriet, insisting that she disappeared. He also says that his father was too theatrical and that leaving the bodies out to be found was a step too far, as it drew unwanted attention. As Martin is in the process of hanging Blomkvist, Salander appears and attacks him with a golf club. While she frees Blomkvist, Martin flees in his car. Salander gives chase on her motorcycle. When Martin drives off the road, Salander finds him still alive but trapped in the vehicle. She then simply walks away as the car catches fire and he burns to death.

Blomkvist realises that Cecilia's late sister Anita was the near-double of Harriet and that some of the photographs taken on the day of Harriet's disappearance show Anita, not Harriet as previously thought. Blomkvist and Salander discover that Harriet has been using Anita's name and is still alive in Australia. Blomkvist flies there to look for her, and he persuades her to return to Sweden, where she is reunited with her uncle. Harriet explains the truth about her disappearance: that her father and her brother had repeatedly raped her; that she killed her father by drowning him, which was witnessed by Martin; and that her cousin Anita had smuggled her away from the island prior to her death. Harriet notes that her brother was harsher to her than her father and that she knew that remaining on the island would lead to her death at her brother's hands. As a way of letting Henrik know that she was alive, Harriet sent him a pressed flower every year. She apologises for frightening Henrik as he had misinterpreted these messages, but Henrik reassures her by explaining that thanks to her messages, the truth has come out.

Salander's elderly mother, living in a nursing home, apologises for not choosing a "better papa" for her. Salander then visits Blomkvist in prison and gives him new information on the Wennerström case. From prison, Blomkvist publishes a new story on Wennerström in Millennium which ruins Wennerström and restores his reputation. Wennerström is then found dead, which the police write off as a suicide. His offshore bank account in the Cayman Islands is raided by a young woman caught on CCTV, whom Blomkvist recognises as Salander in a blond wig. The film ends with Salander, now wealthy and living under an assumed identity, as she is walking along a sunny beach promenade.

Cast

 Michael Nyqvist as Mikael Blomkvist
 Noomi Rapace as Lisbeth Salander
 Lena Endre as Erika Berger
 Sven-Bertil Taube as Henrik Vanger
 Peter Haber as Martin Vanger
 Peter Andersson as Nils Bjurman
 Marika Lagercrantz as Cecilia Vanger
 Ingvar Hirdwall as Dirch Frode
 Björn Granath as Gustav Morell
 Ewa Fröling as Harriet Vanger
 Michalis Koutsogiannakis as Dragan Armansky
 Annika Hallin as Annika Giannini
 Tomas Köhler as "Plague"
 Gunnel Lindblom as Isabella Vanger
 Gösta Bredefeldt as Harald Vanger
 Stefan Sauk as Hans-Erik Wennerström
 Jacob Ericksson as Christer Malm
 Julia Sporre as young Harriet Vanger
 Tehilla Blad as young Lisbeth Salander
 Sofia Ledarp as Malin Eriksson
 David Dencik as Janne Dahlman
 Reuben Sallmander as Enrico Giannini
 Alexandra Hummingson as an unnamed journalist

Release

Critical response
The Girl with the Dragon Tattoo was well received by critics. The review aggregator website Rotten Tomatoes gives the film a normalized score of 85% based on 188 reviews, with an average score of 7.27/10 and declares it "Certified Fresh". The critical consensus is: "Its graphic violence and sprawling length will prove too much for some viewers to take, but Noomi Rapace's gripping performance makes The Girl With the Dragon Tattoo an unforgettable viewing experience." Metacritic gives the film a weighted average score of 76% based on reviews from 36 critics. Roger Ebert of the Chicago Sun-Times gave the film four out of four stars, noting that "[the film] is a compelling thriller to begin with, but it adds the rare quality of having a heroine more fascinating than the story".

Box office
The film grossed more than $10 million in North America in a limited release of 202 theatres. The total gross worldwide is $104,617,430.

Awards and nominations

TV miniseries

French premium pay television channel Canal+ aired extended versions of the three films as a miniseries between March and June 2010, before the theatrical release of the second and third films, consisting of six parts of 90 minutes each. The first part attracted 1.2 million viewers, the largest audience of a foreign series at Canal+ that year. The series aired on US pay-for-view cable networks in the weeks leading up to the release of David Fincher's 2011 film adaptation of the novel.

A home video set of all six parts of the miniseries was released on DVD and Blu-ray Disc by Music Box Home Entertainment on 6 December 2011.

See also
 The Girl with the Dragon Tattoo (American adaptation)

References

External links
 
 
 
 
 
 
 Charlie Rose: A look at the film 'The Girl with the Dragon Tattoo' with director Niels Arden Oplev

Millennium (novel series) adaptations
2009 films
2009 crime thriller films
2000s mystery thriller films
2000s serial killer films
Best Film Guldbagge Award winners
Best Foreign Language Film BAFTA Award winners
Danish crime thriller films
Films about journalists
Films about violence against women
Films based on crime novels
Films based on mystery novels
Films based on Swedish novels
Films based on thriller novels
Films directed by Niels Arden Oplev
Films set in 2002
Films set in 2003
Films set in Stockholm
Films shot in Almería
Films shot in Stockholm
Films set on fictional islands
German crime thriller films
German films about revenge
German mystery thriller films
German serial killer films
Incest in film
Nordisk Film films
Patricide in fiction
Rape and revenge films
Swedish crime thriller films
Swedish detective films
Swedish films about revenge
2000s Swedish-language films
Swedish mystery thriller films
2000s German films
2000s Swedish films